Longdon is a village and a civil parish in the Malvern Hills District and council ward of the county of Worcestershire, England and lies about 5 km (3 miles) south of Upton-on-Severn.  It is jointly administered with two other parishes by Longdon, Queenhill and Holdfast Parish Council.

Parish Church
The Church of St. Mary stands within the village.

Village Hall and Green
The Village Hall and Village Green are administered by a single Trust.

Marshland and nature reserve
Longdon Marsh is an area of flat land spreading into neighbouring Eldersfield, now mostly drained for agriculture. The Worcestershire Wildlife Trust owns and maintains the Hill Court Farm & The Blacklands flagship nature reserve on an area of former marshland within Longdon and aims to restore it to its former wetland state.

References

Villages in Worcestershire
Civil parishes in Worcestershire
Malvern Hills District